The 1948–49 season in Swedish football, starting August 1948 and ending July 1949:

Honours

Official titles

Competitions

Promotions, relegations and qualifications

Promotions

League transfers

Relegations

Domestic results

Allsvenskan 1948–49

Division 2 Nordöstra 1948–49

Division 2 Sydvästra 1948–49

Norrländska Mästerskapet 1949 
Final

Svenska Cupen 1948 
Final

National team results

Notes

References 
Print

Online

 
Seasons in Swedish football